Bionicle was a line of toys and associated media made by Lego from 2000 to 2016.

Bionicle may also refer to:

Lego media 
Various official Bionicle media properties produced or licensed by Lego, especially:

Bionicle (film series)
Bionicle: Mask of Light (2003)
Bionicle 2: Legends of Metru Nui (2004)
Bionicle 3: Web of Shadows (2005)
Bionicle: The Legend Reborn (2009)
Bionicle (video game), also called Bionicle: The Game, released for multiple platforms in 2003
Bionicle: Matoran Adventures, Game Boy Advance game released in 2002
Bionicle: Maze of Shadows, Game Boy Advance game released in 2005
Bionicle, the franchise's first comic book series, published by DC Comics (2001–2005); see List of Bionicle media
Bionicle Ignition, the franchise's second comic book series, published by DC Comics (2006–2008)
Bionicle Glatorian, the franchise's third comic book series, published by DC Comics (2009–2010)

See also